The 1949 Yukon general election was held on 25 July 1949 to elect the three members of the Yukon Territorial Council. The council was non-partisan and had merely an advisory role to the federally appointed Commissioner.

Members
Dawson - Charles Lelievre
Mayo - Ernest Corp
Whitehorse - Richard Lee

References

1949
Yukon general election
Election
Yukon general election